Xylocrius is a genus of beetles in the family Cerambycidae, containing the following species:

 Xylocrius agassizi (LeConte, 1861)
 Xylocrius cribratus LeConte, 1873

References

Callidiini